The Glasgow and South Western Railway (GSWR) 34 class is a class of ten  0-4-2 steam locomotives designed in 1858.

Development 
The ten examples of this class were designed by Patrick Stirling for the GSWR and were built by R & W Hawthorn (Works Nos. 1034-43) between July 1858  and January 1859. They were numbered 34, 36, 32, 25, 110–115.
The  members of the class were fitted with domeless boilers and safety valves over the firebox.

Withdrawal 
The locomotives were withdrawn by James Stirling between 1874 and 1876.

References 

034
Standard gauge steam locomotives of Great Britain
Railway locomotives introduced in 1858
0-4-2 locomotives